Ciudad de La Habana is a Cuban football team playing at the top level. It is based in Havana.  Their home stadium is Estadio Pedro Marrero.

Football clubs in Cuba
Sport in Havana